Claire Massey is a New Zealand agribusiness academic. As of 2018, she is a full professor at the Massey University.

Academic career

After a 1999 PhD titled  'The role of the external consultant in facilitating enterprise development'  at the Massey University, Massey joined the staff, rising to full professor.

For almost a decade Massey was chair of the Wellington Jewish Community Centre.

Selected works 
 Cameron, Alan Ferguson, and Claire Massey. Small and medium-sized enterprises: A New Zealand perspective. Longman, 1999.
 Sligo, F. X., and Claire Massey. "Risk, trust and knowledge networks in farmers' learning." Journal of Rural Studies 23, no. 2 (2007): 170–182.
 Flett, Ross, Fiona Alpass, Steve Humphries, Claire Massey, Stuart Morriss, and Nigel Long. "The technology acceptance model and use of technology in New Zealand dairy farming." Agricultural Systems 80, no. 2 (2004): 199–211.
 Massey, Claire, and Robyn Walker. "Aiming for organisational learning: consultants as agents of change." The Learning Organization 6, no. 1 (1999): 38–44.
 Lewis, Kate, and Claire Massey. "Delivering enterprise education in New Zealand." Education+ Training 45, no. 4 (2003): 197–206.

References

Living people
New Zealand women academics
New Zealand Jews
Massey University alumni
Academic staff of the Massey University
New Zealand business theorists
Agricultural economists
Year of birth missing (living people)
Place of birth missing (living people)
New Zealand women writers